Robert S. Wilder (born August 1, 1964) is an American football coach who most recently served as the head coach of the Old Dominion Monarchs football team.  He was only the second coach all-time in the program's history and the first since football's rebirth at the school in the NCAA Division I Football Championship Subdivision (FCS) in 2009. 

Old Dominion played football for eleven seasons when the university was a two-year institution known as the Norfolk Division of the College of William and Mary.  Between 1930 and 1940, the team compiled a record of 42-36-4.  The program was then discontinued due to a rule banning freshman players and a US$10,000 debt. 

Hired in 2007, Wilder spent the first two years recruiting and starting up the program.  In 2009, in his first competitive season as head coach, the Monarchs finished 9–2.  That was the best winning record ever for a first-year program in college football's modern era.  The Monarchs were outscored by a total of only eight points in their two losses.  

Wilder's inaugural team finished the year ranked in the top ten in five FCS statistical categories, including second in sacks allowed, third in scoring offense, turnover margin and net punting.  The 2009 Monarchs were ninth in rushing offense.

ODU was fifth in FCS attendance in 2009, selling out all of their home games in the 19,782-seat Foreman Field.

In his first three years, Wilder led Old Dominion to a 26–7 record.  In 2011, in the Monarchs first season in the Colonial Athletic Association, they earned a berth in the 2011 FCS playoffs, hosting crosstown rival Norfolk State.  Also in 2011, after playing 27 games in its "modern era", ODU received its first Top 25 ranking on October 3, coming in at No. 21 in The Sports Network poll.  The Monarchs were ranked among the Top Ten after competing in 33 games.

Biography
Wilder grew up in Madison, Maine and attended Madison Area Memorial High School, where he graduated in 1982. A highly recruited quarterback, Wilder opted to play his college ball close to home. Upon graduation from the University of Maine in 1987 with a degree in physical education, Wilder served as a graduate assistant coach for two seasons under Jack Bicknell at Boston College, where he earned his master's degree in educational administration in 1990. He then returned to Maine, where he was an assistant coach, assistant head coach and finally associate head coach from 1990 to 2006.

He has two sons, Derek and Drew.  They reside in Norfolk.

Head coaching record

Notes

References

1964 births
Living people
American football quarterbacks
Boston College Eagles football coaches
Maine Black Bears football coaches
Maine Black Bears football players
Old Dominion Monarchs football coaches

Lynch School of Education and Human Development alumni

People from Madison, Maine
Coaches of American football from Maine
Players of American football from Maine